54th Street is a two-mile-long (3.2 km), one-way street traveling west to east across Midtown Manhattan.

Notable places, west to east

Twelfth Avenue
The route begins at Twelfth Avenue (New York Route 9A). Opposite the intersection is the New York Passenger Ship Terminal and the Hudson River. This is the only two-way portion of 54th Street; the remainder (east of Eleventh Avenue) is one-way eastbound.
De Witt Clinton Park. The West Side neighborhood of Clinton derives its name from the park. (south)

Eleventh Avenue
Clinton Towers Apartments, 39-floor apartment building completed in 1974 (north)
The Nightly Show with Larry Wilmore studios
AT&T Switching Center at 811 Tenth Avenue, 21-story, 113 m/370 ft switching station completed in 1964 (south)

Tenth Avenue
Sony Music Studios, 460 West 54th (south)
The Hit Factory, 421 West 54th (north)

Ninth Avenue
New York City Transit Rapid Transit Division's Rail Command Control Center, on former site of 54th Street Bus Depot and Ninth Avenue Railroad barn at 354 West 54th (south)
Midtown Community Court (south)
Midtown North precinct of New York City Police (south)

Eighth Avenue

The section between Eighth and Broadway is signed Señor Wences Way, for the ventriloquist who had appeared on The Ed Sullivan Show (produced nearby) and who lived in the Ameritania Hotel.
The Marc, 260 West 54th, 42-floor, 142 m / 464 ft apartment tower on top of municipal garage (south)
Studio 54 (south)
Ameritania Hotel (south)

Broadway
The corner of Broadway and 54th is signed "Big Apple Corner" in honor of writer John J. Fitz Gerald who lived there and popularized the phrase Big Apple.
1700 Broadway, 42-story, 162 m / 533 ft office tower that is headquarters of King World Productions

Seventh Avenue

1325 Avenue of the Americas (north) (actually closer to Seventh Avenue) 35-story 153 m / 502 ft, is the office tower that was portrayed in Seinfeld as Elaine's workplace. It is connected to the Hilton Hotel. (south)
 Conrad (formerly The London NYC), 54-floor 180m/590ft mixed-use tower; tallest building on West 54th  (north)
Ziegfeld Theatre (north)
New York Hilton Hotel, 49-floor, 148 m  hotel completed in 1963. Designed by Lapidus, it was originally supposed to resemble Miami Beach's curved Fontainebleau Hotel, but was later changed to resembled the nearby New York Sheraton which Lapidus had also designed. (south)
1345 Avenue of the Americas, 50-story, 191 m / 625 ft office tower (north)

Sixth Avenue
1330 Sixth Avenue, called "Brown Rock" when it was headquarters of ABC Television (south)
Financial Times Building, 41-story, 151 m / 496 ft office tower completed in 1965 (south)
The Warwick Hotel, 36-story, 111 m / 363 ft hotel completed in 1927 (north)
Tower Verre, an under-construction 77-story, 320 m / 1,050 ft tower at 53 West 53rd Street (south)
Museum of Modern Art (south)
Museum Tower 52-story Cesar Pelli tower completed in 1985
Rockefeller Apartments, a New York City landmark
Residences at 5–15 West 54th Street, a series of townhouses built in the late 1890s. All of these are New York City designated landmarks and collectively form a National Register of Historic Places district.
 13 and 15 West 54th Street occupied by John D. Rockefeller Jr. and Nelson Rockefeller
 9–11 West 54th Street, occupied by James J. Goodwin and Josephine Goodwin 
 7 West 54th Street occupied by Philip Lehman and Robert Lehman
 5 West 54th Street, occupied by Moses Allen Starr and Alice Dunning Starr
4 West 54th Street, Mansion and Residence of John D. Rockefeller (now Museum of Modern Art) 
University Club (north)

Fifth Avenue
520 Madison Avenue, 43-story, 176 m / 577 ft office tower with sloping lower walls and a section of the Berlin Wall in its adjoining park (south)
William H. Moore House, 4 East 54th Street (south)
689 Fifth Avenue (north)
19 East 54th Street (north)

Madison Avenue
Dillon, Read & Company Building, 36-story 141 m /464 ft building completed in 1982
527 Madison, 26-story, 107 m  building completed in 1986
Hotel Elysee (south)

Park Avenue
399 Park Avenue, headquarter of Citigroup (south)
Lever House (south)

Lexington Avenue
Citigroup Center, tallest building on street (south)

Third Avenue

Lipstick Building (south)
909 Third Avenue, 32-floor tower built above the FDR Station (a post office) (north)

Second Avenue
 Neighborhood Playhouse, 340 East 54th Street
 East 54th Recreation Center
 Mondrian Condominiums, 43-story 134 m  apartment complex completed in 1992

First Avenue
Rivertower Apartments, 39-floor apartments (south)
Saint James' Tower, 30-floor apartments

Sutton Place South
The street ends at a cul-de-sac off Sutton Place South.

References

External links

 54th Street: A New York Songline - virtual walking tour

054
Midtown Manhattan